"Juice Train" (or "Orange Juice Train") is the popular name for unit trains of Tropicana fresh orange juice operated by railroads in the United States.

History

Tropicana Products was founded in 1947 in Bradenton, Florida, by Anthony T. Rossi, an Italian immigrant, growing from 50 employees to over 3,000 in 2003. Early distribution of fresh orange juice was by way of hand-delivered juice jars to nearby homes, but demand grew, especially in New York City. The ship's last voyage was in 1961 when transportation shifted to truck and rail transport.

In 1970, Tropicana orange juice was shipped in bulk via insulated boxcars in one weekly round-trip from Florida to Kearny, New Jersey. On June 7, 1971 the "Great White Juice Train" (the first unit train in the food industry, consisting of 150  insulated boxcars fabricated in the Alexandria, Virginia shops of Fruit Growers Express) commenced service over the  route. An additional 100 cars were soon incorporated into the fleet, and small mechanical refrigeration units were installed to keep temperatures constant on hot days. Tropicana saved $40 million in fuel costs alone during the first ten years in operation.

Route and operations

Starting out on Seaboard Coast Line Railroad (SCL) south of Tampa, Florida, the original used former Seaboard Air Line Railroad (SAL) and Atlantic Coast Line Railroad (ACL) tracks. It crossed over to the Richmond, Fredericksburg and Potomac (RF&P) in Richmond, Virginia at pier 5 of the famous concrete James River Bridge. At Potomac Yard, in Alexandria, Virginia, Penn Central Transportation (PC) took over and operated it under the overhead wire with electric locomotives most of the way to Kearny.  

There have been more than a few changes over the years. Tropicana, now a division of PepsiCo, became the world's leading producer of branded fruit juices. In 1976, Conrail (CR) took over from ill-fated Penn Central, with electrification discontinued in 1981. SCL became part of CSX Corporation (CSX) in 1980, and was successively merged into Seaboard System Railroad (SBD) and then CSX Transportation, which also included RF&P by 1991. In 1997, a second Juice Train began serving Cincinnati, Ohio. When CSX acquired part of Conrail in 1999, an all-CSX train began traveling to a new larger facility in Jersey City, New Jersey on the National Docks Secondary.

Rolling stock has also changed, including orange, white, and blue cars, some with innovative refrigeration. Designated "TPIX" they are custom-built to Tropicana's specification. The Florida East Coast Railway (FEC) is now carrying Tropicana cars from a second processing facility in Fort Pierce, Florida. A reliable and economically viable transport mode, the Juice Trains are also a powerful mode of advertising, running ten trips each week to Jersey City and Cincinnati. Additional shipments with specially-equipped refrigerated cars currently travel  by rail to California. Tropicana had its own GE 70-ton switcher locomotive, No. 98, to switch cars at the New Jersey destination.

In 2017 CSX abolished separate Juice Trains between Philadelphia and Florida. Tropicana products are now carried on other CSX trains to and from Florida. A separate train for Tropicana operates over the short distance north of Philadelphia.

Routes list

References

External links
Tropicana's Official Web Site
CSX Corporation Official Web Site
Florida East Coast Railway Official Web Site

Refrigerator car lines of the United States
Railway services introduced in 1947
CSX Transportation
Tropicana Products